Clive Anthony Wigginton (born 18 October 1950) is an English former footballer who scored 22 goals from 483 appearances in the lower divisions of The Football League. He played for Grimsby Town, Scunthorpe United, Lincoln City, Doncaster Rovers and Torquay United, before moving into non-league football with Gainsborough Trinity. He played as a centre half.

References

1950 births
Living people
Footballers from Sheffield
English footballers
Association football defenders
Grimsby Town F.C. players
Scunthorpe United F.C. players
Lincoln City F.C. players
Doncaster Rovers F.C. players
Torquay United F.C. players
Gainsborough Trinity F.C. players
English Football League players